Farley is a civil parish in the district of Staffordshire Moorlands, Staffordshire, England. It contains 54 listed buildings that are recorded in the National Heritage List for England.  Of these, five are at Grade II*, the middle of the three grades, and the others are at Grade II, the lowest grade.  The most impressive building in the parish is the country house of Alton Towers.  This, together with its surrounding gardens, were developed for the Earls of Shrewsbury in the early 19th century.  The house and associated structures, and many items in the gardens are listed.  Outside the grounds of the house, the parish contains the village of Farley and the surrounding countryside.  The listed buildings here are mainly houses, cottages, and associated structures, farmhouses and farm buildings.  The other listed buildings include structures in the former Alton Towers railway station, and two mileposts.


Key

Buildings

References

Citations

Sources

Lists of listed buildings in Staffordshire